Seasons
Seasons Kilkenny
 
Kilkenny